Honey is the seventh studio album by American band the Ohio Players. Released on August 16, 1975, by Mercury Records. It is generally regarded as a classic, the band's best album, and the last great full-length release of their dominant era in the mid-1970s.

The cover image gained mild notoriety from urban legends involving one of the singles, "Love Rollercoaster", one to the effect that the honey injured Ester Cordet’s skin, ruining her career as a model, and another claiming that she was stabbed to death in the recording booth, with her scream captured on the song. These stories are false.

The album was recorded and mixed at Paragon Recording Studios in Chicago, with Barry Mraz as the recording engineer. Marty Link, Steve Kusiciel, Rob Kingsland, and Paul Johnson are credited as tape operators.  Gilbert Kong mastered the final mix at Masterdisk in New York City.

The album peaked at #2 on the Billboard 200 during the week of September 27, 1975, kept out of the top spot by Jefferson Starship's Red Octopus.  In addition, it was the third album from the band to top the Soul/Black Albums chart, where it spent three weeks.

Release history

In addition to the standard 2 channel stereo version the album was also released in a 4 channel quadraphonic version in 1975. This version appeared on 8-track tape in the US and was the fourth of five Ohio Players albums available in this format. The quad version was re-issued on DTS Audio CD in 2001.

Track listing

Personnel
James "Diamond" Williams – drums, timbales, congas, percussion, lead & background vocals
Billy Beck – piano, Hammond organ, Fender Rhodes piano, RMI electric piano, clavinet, ARP Odyssey, ARP string ensemble, percussion, lead & background vocals
Marvin "Merv" Pierce – trumpets, flugelhorn
Marshall "Rock" Jones – electric bass
Leroy "Sugarfoot" Bonner – guitars, lead & background vocals
Ralph "Pee Wee" Middlebrooks – trumpets
Clarence "Satch" Satchell – tenor saxophone, baritone saxophone, flute

Production
Ohio Players – producers
Barry Mraz, Gilbert Kong & Tom Hanson ; engineers
Marty Linke, Steve Kusiciel, Rob Kingsland, Paul Johnson – tape operators
Richard Fegley – photography
Jim Ladwig – art direction
Joe Kotleba – design

Cover versions
 "Fopp" by Soundgarden, from the 1988 EP Fopp
 "Love Rollercoaster" by Red Hot Chili Peppers, from the 1996 soundtrack to Beavis and Butt-head Do America
 "Let's Love" by Vanessa Williams, on her covers album Everlasting Love

Charts

Weekly charts

Year-end charts

Singles

See also
List of number-one R&B albums of 1975 (U.S.)

References

External links
 Honey at Discogs

1975 albums
Ohio Players albums
Mercury Records albums